Conversations with Inanimate Objects is the debut album by American comedian Gary Gulman, released on New Wave Entertainment in 2005. The album was reissued on New Wave Dynamics in 2013.

Track listing

2005 debut albums
2000s comedy albums